Jorge Romero may refer to:
Jorge Romero Brest (1905-1989), Argentine art critic
Jorge Romero (footballer), Paraguayan footballer
Jorge Eduardo Romero (born 1939), Argentine football referee
Jorge Romero Romero (1964–2021), Mexican politician
Jorge Romero (football manager) (born 1984), Spanish football manager